Kitahama Station is the name of two Japanese railway stations:

 Kitahama Station (Hokkaidō), JR Hokkaido's station in Abashiri 
 Kitahama Station (Osaka), Keihan Line and Osaka Subway's station in Osaka